Ramser Arboretum (680 acres) is an arboretum at the intersection of Ohio State Route 3 and Ohio State Route 205 in Danville, Ohio. Although privately owned, the arboretum is open to the public year-round except for deer-hunting season.

The arboretum contains native woodland, planted hardwood, and agricultural land, with six miles (10 km) of hiking trails on hilly terrain.

See also 
 List of botanical gardens in the United States

External links
Birding Trail brochure with location map including Ramser Arboretum
Visitor's Guide to Knox County, see page 12 for Ramser Arboretum
Website: http://www.ramserarbor.org/

Arboreta in Ohio
Botanical gardens in Ohio
Protected areas of Knox County, Ohio